Heiko Westermann (born 14 August 1983) is a German former professional footballer who played as a central defender.

Club career

Greuther Fürth
Westermann began his professional career with 2. Bundesliga club Greuther Fürth. He joined the senior squad in July 2002 but did not make his first appearance until 26 January 2003 in a 1–0 win over MSV Duisburg. He played a total of 83 league games in his three seasons with the club, scoring two goals.

Arminia Bielefeld
Following the 2004–05 season, Westermann signed for recently promoted Bundesliga club Arminia Bielefeld. In his first season, he played in every single game for Bielefeld, including 34 league and five DFB-Pokal matches. The following season Westermann remained an integral part of the team, missing only one match.

Schalke 04
Westermann moved to Schalke 04 in 2007 for a fee of €2.8 million. He played his first game for Schalke on 24 July in a Ligapokal fixture against 1. FC Nürnberg. Schalke won 4–2 with Westermann contributing one goal. Missing Schalke's first two league games through injury, Westermann made his Bundesliga debut for the club on 26 August 2007. He was substituted on in the 79th minute for Rafinha in a third round match against VfL Wolfsburg. For the remainder of the season, Westermann started all 31 of Schalke's Bundesliga matches. He was also instrumental in Schalke's Champions League campaign, being the only outfield player for the club to play every single minute.

With new coach Fred Rutten taking charge of Schalke for the 2008–09 season, combined with his keen eye for goal, Westermann has often been positioned in midfield. The current season has been Westermann's highest scoring yet. He scored both goals in a 2–0 DFB-Pokal win over Hannover 96. He also scored a goal in three consecutive Bundesliga matches including the equalizing goal in a 1–1 draw against Werder Bremen and a game-winning goal against VfL Bochum.

Hamburger SV
In July 2010, Westermann agreed to a transfer to Hamburger SV, reportedly in the region of €7.5 million. Despite being a new signing, he was named new captain by then HSV coach Armin Veh. On 9 April 2013, following a run of bad results, including a 9–2 drubbing by Bayern Munich, Rafael van der Vaart was announced as Westermann's successor as the club's captain, in a bid to relieve him of mounting pressure.
On 25 June 2015, Hamburg confirmed Westermann's contract would not be renewed for the 2015–16 campaign.

Betis
On 6 August 2015 Westermann signed a two-year deal with Real Betis, newly promoted to La Liga. He received his first ever career red card on 28 November 2015 after his second bookable offence against Levante.

Ajax
On 14 July 2016, it was announced that Westermann had signed a two-year deal with Eredivisie side Ajax. However, he was used sparingly, so he worked as a youth coach during his time there.

Austria Wien
Shortly after his contract with Ajax had been dissolved, Westermann signed a two-year deal with Austrian side Austria Wien.

He announced his departure from the club along with the end of his active player career in April 2018.

International career
On 31 January 2008, Westermann was first called up by Germany's manager Joachim Löw for the friendly on 6 February 2008 at Vienna's Ernst-Happel-Stadion against Austria. Germany won the match 3–0 and Westermann was in the starting eleven and played 90 minutes. Westermann was part of the German team that finished in second place at Euro 2008. On 2 June 2009, Westermann scored the first international goal in Germany's 7–2 rout against United Arab Emirates national football team. He was part of Germany's preliminary selection for the World Cup 2010, but had to pull out because of an injury suffered in a friendly against Hungary. He has been capped 27 times by Germany and has scored four goals for them since 2008.

Personal life
Westermann's wife is named Irina, they married in June 2007. In May 2008, the couple had their first daughter, Lana. In October 2010, Nikita, their second daughter was born.

Career statistics

Club

International
Scores and results list Germany's goal tally first, score column indicates score after each Westermann goal.

Honours
Ajax
 UEFA Europa League runner-up: 2017

Germany
 UEFA European Championship runner-up: 2008

References

External links
  
 
 
 

1983 births
Living people
People from Alzenau
Sportspeople from Lower Franconia
Footballers from Bavaria
German footballers
Germany international footballers
Germany under-21 international footballers
Germany youth international footballers
Association football defenders
Association football midfielders
Association football utility players
SpVgg Greuther Fürth players
Arminia Bielefeld players
FC Schalke 04 players
Hamburger SV players
Real Betis players
AFC Ajax players
FK Austria Wien players
Bundesliga players
2. Bundesliga players
La Liga players
Eredivisie players
Austrian Football Bundesliga players
UEFA Euro 2008 players
German expatriate footballers
German expatriate sportspeople in Spain
Expatriate footballers in Spain
Expatriate footballers in the Netherlands
Expatriate footballers in Austria